Gobiopsis canalis, the checkered goby, is a species of goby found in the Western Indian Ocean, from the Persian Gulf, to Oman, and to southwest India.

Size

References

Gobiidae
Taxa named by Ernest A. Lachner
Taxa named by James F. McKinney
Fish described in 1978
Fish of the Indian Ocean